The Man Without a Country is a 1925 American drama film directed by Rowland V. Lee and written by Robert N. Lee. It is based on the 1863 short story The Man Without a Country by Edward Everett Hale. The film stars Guy Edward Hearn, Pauline Starke, Lucy Beaumont, Richard Tucker, Earl Metcalfe, and Edward Coxen. Originally titled As No Man Has Loved, the film was released on February 11, 1925, by Fox Film Corporation.

Plot
As described in a film magazine review, young officer Philip Nolan, from a patriotic family, is attached to a frontier army post in 1800 when he joins the cause of Aaron Burr with his dream of a western empire. After he is court-martialed, he is asked to recant and replies, "Damn the United States! I hope that I may never hear of the United States again." His sentence is to be sent aboard a ship and never to hear of or set foot in the United States again. He begins a journey around the world that lasts through 10 presidential administrations, during which time his sweetheart Anne Bissell attempts to have him freed. After several heroic actions, including saving the day in a fight with a pirate ship, Anne secures a pardon from President Lincoln. Now old, Nolan dies as the ship is returning to the United States, and Anne dies waiting on the pier. The film ends with the spirits of Nolan and Anne together with an American flag.

Cast

References

External links

1925 films
1920s English-language films
Silent American drama films
1925 drama films
Fox Film films
Films directed by Rowland V. Lee
American silent feature films
American black-and-white films
1920s American films